The 2018–19 season was Torino Football Club's 108th season of competitive football, 91st season in the top division of Italian football and 74th season in Serie A. The club competed in Serie A and in the Coppa Italia.

The season was coach Walter Mazzarri's first full campaign in charge of Torino, after replacing Siniša Mihajlović following his sacking during the 2017–18 season.

Players

Squad information
Last updated on 26 May 2019
Appearances include league matches only

Transfers

In

Loans in

Out

Loans out

Competitions

Serie A

League table

Results summary

Results by round

Matches

Coppa Italia

Statistics

Appearances and goals

|-
! colspan=14 style=background:#dcdcdc; text-align:center| Goalkeepers

|-
! colspan=14 style=background:#dcdcdc; text-align:center| Defenders

|-
! colspan=14 style=background:#dcdcdc; text-align:center| Midfielders

|-
! colspan=14 style=background:#dcdcdc; text-align:center| Forwards

|-
! colspan=14 style=background:#dcdcdc; text-align:center| Players transferred out during the season

Goalscorers

Last updated: 26 May 2019

Clean sheets

Last updated: 26 May 2019

Disciplinary record

Last updated: 26 May 2019

References

Torino F.C. seasons
Torino